The Morris Ital is a medium-sized car that was built by British Leyland (BL) from 1980 to 1984. A successor to the Morris Marina, it was available in a variety of bodystyles.

Design and launch

The Ital was given the design code ADO73 F/L (because it was considered a facelift of the Series 2 Marina (ADO73) launched in 1976) and was first launched on 1 July 1980. It took its name from Giorgetto Giugiaro's Italdesign studio, which had been employed by BL to manage the re-engineering of the Morris Marina, which had been produced by the company since 1971. Although BL's advertising emphasised the car's connection with the Italian design house, Italdesign did not have a direct role in the styling of the new car, which had been handled in-house by Harris Mann. Italdesign had been involved in a consultancy role, to help design new tooling and assembly methods, and work out how to integrate the altered parts of the new car into the existing Marina production chain. That is why, despite bearing the studio's name, the Ital is absent from lists of styling jobs handled by the firm. It was originally planned to brand the car as the Morris Marina Ital but, for most markets, the Marina name was dropped on the orders of British Leyland CEO, Michael Edwardes, and only the Ital name was used.

The Ital had revised exterior styling, but retained the Marina's 1.3- and 1.7-litre petrol engines and rear-wheel drive chassis. The dashboard and interior of the Marina were also carried over largely unaltered, including the main fascia panel, which faced 'away' from the driver. The Marina's coupé variant was not produced in Ital form, but the four door saloon, the five door estate, and the pickup and van versions, were carried over from the Marina range. 

From October 1980, an automatic version of the Ital was available with the 2.0-litre O-Series power unit, as the range topping 2.0HLS. Only about 1,000 2.0HLS models were sold. Due to that, and their short production run, the 2.0HLS is the rarest Ital model. In November 1981, all HL and HLS models were fitted with upgraded interior trim.

Finally, in September 1982, a revised Ital range was introduced. The L and 2.0-litre models were dropped, and the HL and HLS were replaced by the SL and SLX models. Front suspension was changed to telescopic front dampers across the range, and parabolic rear springs were also fitted, together with additional soundproofing and improved trim. 

Thus cropped, the range then consisted of the 1.3 SL and SLX saloon, 1.3 SL estate, 1.7 SLX saloon, and the 1.7 SL saloon and estate. The saloon models were dropped in February 1984, with the estate models remaining in production until the summer of that year. 

During the 1970s, British Leyland had been working on the development of an all-new car to replace the Morris Marina, and the Ital was only ever intended as a stop gap replacement between the demise of the Marina and the launch of an entirely new model. However, a shortage of funds meant that the launch was delayed by several years, until it emerged in April 1984 as the Austin Montego.

Portuguese assembly

Although most Itals were manufactured in the United Kingdom, there were also Portuguese assembled Itals which were all equipped with the ancient 1.5 litre B-series diesel engine, producing 37 hp. Portuguese Itals retained the "Marina" badge (actually "Morris Marina 1.5 D") and were the only Marina/Itals to receive a diesel engine of any kind. 

The British Leyland factory in Setúbal (IMA) then switched to producing the Mini Moke.

Sales
The Ital sold reasonably well in Britain during the start of the 1980s, as it offered a competitive asking price and low running costs. The Ital's technology differed from many of its contemporaries, such as the Opel Ascona/Vauxhall Cavalier, as well as the Talbot Alpine, which all used front wheel drive. 

After the introduction of the Opel Ascona C / Vauxhall Cavalier Mark II in August 1981, the Ital and Ford's Cortina (and later Sierra) were the only European mass volume cars in the sector to retain rear wheel drive.

Demise of Morris
The Ital was the last production car to wear the Morris badge, although there was a Morris badged van version of the Metro produced until 1984. Production of the Ital was switched from Cowley to Longbridge in September 1982 to allow the Cowley plant to be upgraded for production of the forthcoming Austin Montego and Austin Maestro. At this time, the Ital received an upgrade with different front and rear suspension (parabolic rear springs and telescopic front dampers) and models were redesignated SL and SLX. 

The saloon was dropped from the line in February 1984 with the van and estate completing outgoing contracts for another six months, until they too were axed. From this point, the Morris marque was kept alive solely by the Metro van, and three years later the Morris badge had finally been consigned to history after 75 years, when it was removed from the van version of the Metro. 

The Ital's successor was the Austin Montego, launched in April 1984 as a four-door saloon, with a five-door estate arriving in October 1984.

Later production in China
After production in the United Kingdom ceased, the Ital's production tooling was sold to the Chengdu Auto Works, a company belonging to the First Auto Works Group in Sichuan province, China. In 1998, the Ital estate (utilising a locally made chassis) reappeared there, under the name Huandu CAC6430 (Chinese: 环都). Van and pick up variants were also produced. Chengdu Auto Works is thought to have closed down in May 1999.

Reputation
Already outdated by the time it was launched, and continually saddled with build quality problems, the Ital soon gained a very bad reputation. The Ital was said to have similar rust problems to its predecessor, the Morris Marina, and despite being designated as a successor; surviving Itals are actually rarer than Marinas today on UK roads, although the Morris Marina Owners Club and Morris Ital Register are making sure the few remaining examples survive. As of 2022, there are only 30 Morris Itals still taxed and on the roads in the UK, with another 155 Itals declared SORN (Statutory Off-Road Notice).

References

External links

 Morris Marina Owners Club and Morris Ital Register

British Leyland vehicles
Cars introduced in 1980

Italdesign vehicles
Ital
Rear-wheel-drive vehicles
Sedans
Station wagons
Cars discontinued in 1999